The 1953 Ukrainian Cup was a football knockout competition conducting by the Football Federation of the Ukrainian SSR and was known as the Ukrainian Cup.

Teams

Non-participating teams 
The Ukrainian teams of masters did not take part in the competition.
 1953 Soviet Class A (2): FC Dynamo Kyiv, FC Lokomotyv Kharkiv
 1953 Soviet Class B (4): FC Metalurh Odesa, FC Shakhtar Stalino, FC Metalurh Zaporizhia, FC Metalurh Dnipropetrovsk

Competition schedule

First elimination round

Second elimination round

Quarterfinals

Semifinals

Final

Top goalscorers

See also 
 Soviet Cup
 Ukrainian Cup

Notes

References

External links 
 Information source 

1953
Cup
1953 domestic association football cups